The Sony FE 50mm F2.8 Macro is a full-frame macro prime lens for the Sony E-mount, announced by Sony on August 30, 2016.

As of June 2017, the 50mm Macro lens is one of only 3 E-mount lenses manufactured by Sony that are specifically designed for macro photography, with the others being the Sony E 30mm F3.5 Macro and Sony FE 90mm F2.8 Macro G OSS lenses. Though designed for Sony's full frame E-mount cameras, this lens can be used on Sony's APS-C E-mount camera bodies, producing a field-of-view equivalent on full frame of 75mm.

Build quality
The lens features a weather resistant plastic exterior with a matte black finish. On the side of the lens are a pair of external switches controlling the lens' focusing range and autofocus-manual focus control. There is also a programmable focus-hold button for maintaining focus on a subject in motion.

The lens' autofocus motor is slow yet accurate on older Sony E-mount cameras and performs much better on newer cameras such as the Sony α6500 and Sony α9.

Image quality
The lens is exceptionally sharp from its maximum aperture of f/2.8 across the frame. Distortion, vignetting, and chromatic aberration are all well controlled. The bokeh produced by this lens is smooth at its closest focusing distance.

See also
List of Sony E-mount lenses
Zeiss Touit 2.8/50mm Macro

References

Camera lenses introduced in 2015
90
Macro lenses